The Great Wall SoCool is a Pickup truck produced by Great Wall Motors.

Overview
The Great Wall SoCool is powered by the Toyota-sourced GW491QE inline-4 2.2 liter engine. The Great Wall SoCool is the high version of the Great Wall Sailor and just like the Sailor, the body design of the Great Wall SoCool was based on the third generation Isuzu Faster produced under license sharing a front end with the Great Wall Pegasus and styled completely different from the cheaper Great Wall Sailor. The Great Wall SoCool was later replaced by the Great Wall Wingle built on the same platform.

References

External links

Official website

Socool
Pickup trucks
Trucks of China
Cars of China
Cars introduced in 2003